Paropomala virgata, the virgata toothpick grasshopper, is a species of slant-faced grasshopper in the family Acrididae. It is found in Central America and North America.

References

Further reading

 
 
 
 
 
 

Acrididae
Insects described in 1899